Isidore Battikha (born July 28, 1950 in Aleppo, Syria) is a Syrian archbishop emeritus of the Melkite Greek Catholic Archeparchy of Homs in Syria.

He was also Grand Prior of the Patriarchal Order of the Holy Cross of Jerusalem.

Life

Isidore Battikha was ordained priest on April 11, 1980  and after that was named Chaplain of the Aleppinian Basilian. On August 25, 1992, he was appointed auxiliary bishop of the Melkite Patriarchate of Antioch and named titular bishop of Pelusium of Greek Melkites. On February 9, 2006, he was elected by the Synod of Bishops of the Melkite Greek Catholic Church as the successor of Abraham Nehmé as Archbishop of Homs. The Patriarch of Antioch Maximos V Hakim ordained him to the episcopate on August 25, 1992, and were his co-consecrators Néophytos Edelby, BA and François Abou Mokh, BS. Archbishop Battikha until his resignation was co-consekrator of the Archbishops Elias Chacour and Michel Abrass, BA.

Resignation

On September 6, 2010 Pope Benedict XVI accepted Battikha's resignation, in accordance with the Code of Canons of the Eastern Churches (CCEO), can. 210. The reasons for his resignation are still unknown, and to the Archeparchy of Homs was named Jean-Abdo Arbach in 2012.

Distinctions 
 Grand Prior of the Patriarchal Order of the Holy Cross of Jerusalem

References

External links
 http://www.catholic-hierarchy.org/bishop/bbattikha.html
 http://www.patriarchalischerorden.de/bildergalerie.ht

1950 births
Melkite Greek Catholic bishops
Syrian Christian clergy
Syrian Melkite Greek Catholics
Members of the Patriarchal Order of the Holy Cross of Jerusalem
Living people
People from Aleppo
Eastern Catholic bishops in Syria